Crying and Laughing is a 1900 French short silent film by Georges Méliès. It was sold by Méliès's Star Film Company and is numbered 306 in its catalogues.

The survival status of the film is unclear. In a 1979 book, John Frazer reported that he had seen the film in a private collection; it was a one-minute medium shot of two people together, one crying, one laughing manically. However, Jacques Malthête's 2008 filmography of Méliès's work lists the film as lost. In 2020, the film festival Il Cinema Ritrovato featured a one-minute film from the archives of the Centre national du cinéma, listing the film as Gens qui pleurent, gens qui rient and suggesting that it may be Méliès's film; the attribution is to "[Georges Méliès?]", with a question mark.

References

External links
 

French black-and-white films
Films directed by Georges Méliès
French silent short films
1900s French films